Harry Lapidus Stalmaster (born March 29, 1940) is an American film and television actor. He is perhaps best known for playing the title role in the film Johnny Tremain, based on the 1943 historical novel by Esther Forbes.

Stalmaster was born in Los Angeles, California, and attended Beverly Hills High School. In 1957 he starred in the title role of the film Johnny Tremain. He then attended the University of California, graduating in 1963. He retired from acting in 1966, last appearing in the sitcom television series My Three Sons.

Stalmaster served as an army officer at the Presidio in San Francisco, California, for two years. He also worked as a booking agent.

References

External links 

Rotten Tomatoes profile

1940 births
Living people
People from Los Angeles
Male actors from Los Angeles
American male television actors
20th-century American male actors
University of California, Los Angeles alumni
American talent agents